Hanelle M. Culpepper is an American filmmaker, best known for her work in television directing episodes of 90210, Parenthood, Criminal Minds, Revenge, Grimm, and Star Trek: Discovery along with other series. Prior to working in television, she worked as a production assistant and directed and produced short films. She also directed the thriller feature films Within (2009), Deadly Sibling Rivalry (2011), Murder on the 13th Floor (2012) and Hunt for the Labyrinth Killer (2013).

Culpepper became the first woman director and the first African American director to launch a new Star Trek series in the franchise's history, directing the opening three episodes of Star Trek: Picard (2020).  Culpepper directed and co-executive produced the pilot of the series revival of Kung Fu (2021).

Early life and education 
Culpepper grew up in Alabama in a family that loved movies and television. At first she wanted to be an actor, but her parents pointed out that she was always directing her siblings in plays she wrote and put on.

Her father worked as a lineman for a telephone company in Birmingham. He became one of the first African American executives at the company. Her mother was a homemaker who later worked in a bank and the city government.

Culpepper is a 1988 alumna of Indian Springs School, a private high school outside of Birmingham. In her senior year, she decided she wanted to be a director after directing her first play, a one-act comedy by George S. Kaufman, If Men Played Cards As Women Do.

She attended Lake Forest College, near Chicago, IL. She was active in theater and majored in economics and French, graduating summa cum laude and Phi Beta Kappa. She earned her M.A. from USC Annenberg School for Communication.

Career 

Culpepper is the director and co-executive producer of the pilot of Kung Fu (2021). The series is a reboot of the 1970s television show Kung Fu, which starred David Carradine. Olivia Liang stars in the reboot as a young Chinese American woman, Nicky Chen. Culpepper said that she is honored to introduce "an authentic and honest portrayal of a Chinese American family".

On March 13, 2020, restrictions due to the COVID-19 pandemic temporarily shut down production of the Kung Fu pilot, as well as most film productions around the world. Because of this delay, The CW Television Network producing the new series pushed its launch to later in 2021.

Awards
In 2021, Culpepper was nominated for an NAACP Image Award for Outstanding Directing in a Drama Series for her work on the pilot of Star Trek: Picard, "Remembrance". This was her second Image Award nomination; the first was in 2015 for the Criminal Minds episode, "The Edge of Winter".  Shemar Moore won the Image Award for Best Actor for the episode.

Personal life 
Culpepper met her future husband, Jeffrey Meier, when she was interning at Sony while studying film for her M.A.

Television 
90210
Parenthood
Criminal Minds
Revenge
American Crime
The Flash
Hawaii Five-0
Grimm
Castle
Stalker
The Originals
Sleepy Hollow
Gotham
Empire
Mistresses
American Gothic
Quantico
Rosewood
Ten Days in the Valley
How to Get Away with Murder
Star Trek: Discovery
Lucifer
UnREAL
Supergirl
S.W.A.T.
The Crossing
Mayans M.C.
Counterpart
NOS4A2
Star Trek: Picard (series premiere)
Big Sky
Kung Fu

References

External links
 
 

African-American film directors
African-American film producers
African-American screenwriters
African-American television directors
American film directors
American film producers
American television directors
American women film directors
American women screenwriters
Lake Forest College alumni
USC Annenberg School for Communication and Journalism alumni
American women television directors
Living people
Place of birth missing (living people)
Indian Springs School alumni
American women film producers
Year of birth missing (living people)
21st-century African-American people
21st-century African-American women
African-American women writers